Cobasna (Moldovan Cyrillic: Кобасна; , Kovbasna; , Kolbasnaya) is a commune in northern Transnistria, Moldova that is composed of three villages: Cobasna, Cobasna station, and Suhaia Rîbnița. It is controlled by the self-proclaimed authorities of “Transnistria”. It is located 2 km from the border with Ukraine, in Rîbnița District. Cobasna is the site of a Russian, and formerly Soviet, ammunition depot known as the Cobasna ammunition depot. It has been referred to as the largest in Eastern Europe.

The majority of the original ammunition has either disappeared or has been removed from Cobasna under Organization for Security and Co-operation in Europe (OSCE) supervision. Military equipment which was impractical to remove has undergone on-site destruction as per Moldovan demands that the "weapons dump" of Transnistria be removed. Transnistrian sources claim that the U.S. State Department recognizes that the process of removal of Russian munitions and equipment has been carried out with efficiency during 2003. In 2004 this removal process was blocked by Transnistrian authorities after tensions rose. Today, around 22,000 tons of military equipment and ammunition reportedly remain there, guarded by Russian troops. 1,500 troops of the Operational Group of Russian Forces are stationed in the area.

On 27 April 2022, the Ministry of Internal Affairs of Transnistria reported that drones flew over Cobasna and that shots were fired on the village. The ministry claimed that the drones came from Ukraine. Several attacks had recently occurred in Transnistria at the time. They occurred during the 2022 Russian invasion of Ukraine, and may been a false flag operation by Russia or Transnistria itself.

Notes

References

External links 
 OSCE arms control and disarmament  osce.org
 http://www.blackseanews.net/en/read/68688

Communes of Transnistria
Bratslav Voivodeship
Baltsky Uyezd
Military installations of the Soviet Union
Ammunition dumps
Rîbnița District